Topper  is a 1937 American supernatural comedy film directed by Norman Z. McLeod, starring Constance Bennett and Cary Grant and featuring Roland Young. It tells the story of a stuffy, stuck-in-his-ways man who is haunted by the ghosts of a fun-loving married couple.

The film was adapted by Eric Hatch, Jack Jevne and Eddie Moran from the 1926 novel by Thorne Smith. It was produced by Hal Roach and distributed by Metro-Goldwyn-Mayer. The supporting cast includes Billie Burke and Eugene Pallette. Topper was a huge hit with film audiences in the summer of 1937.

Topper was the first black-and-white film to be digitally colorized, re-released in 1985 by Hal Roach Studios.

Plot
George and Marion Kerby are as irresponsible as they are rich. When George wrecks their classy sports car, they wake up from the accident as ghosts. Realizing they are not in heaven or hell because they have never been responsible enough to do good deeds or bad ones, they decide that freeing their old friend Cosmo Topper from his regimented lifestyle will be their ticket into heaven.

Topper, a wealthy bank president, is trapped in a boring job. Worse still, Clara, his social-climbing wife, seems to care only about nagging him and presenting  a respectable façade. On a whim, after George and Marion die, Topper buys George's flashy sports car. Soon he meets the ghosts of his dead friends, and immediately they begin to liven up his dull life with drinking and dancing, flirting and fun.

The escapades lead quickly to Cosmo's arrest, and the ensuing scandal alienates his wife Clara. However, because of Topper's scandal, some of the people Clara would like to socialize with now become interested in her and Topper. Cosmo moves out into a hotel with Marion who claims she is no longer married since she is dead. Clara fears she has lost Cosmo forever. The Toppers' loyal butler suggests that she lighten up a bit; she decides he's right and dons the lingerie and other attire of "a forward woman". After Cosmo has a near-death experience and nearly joins George and Marion in the afterlife, Cosmo and Clara are happily reunited, and George and Marion, their good deed done, gladly depart for heaven.

Cast

Cast notes
 Early on in the film, songwriter and pianist Hoagy Carmichael makes an uncredited cameo appearance—his debut acting role—as the piano player in the sequence where George and Marion are on the town the night before the meeting at the bank. He introduces the song "Old Man Moon," which is sung by Grant and Bennett. It's also sung later by Three Hits and a Miss. As the couple leave the bar, George (Grant) says, "(Good)night Hoagy!" and Carmichael replies, "So long, see ya next time".
 Lana Turner makes her second film appearance, uncredited, as a nightclub patron.

Production

After a long career producing comedy shorts, producer Hal Roach was always looking to expand into long-form films to complement his Laurel and Hardy features, and found a property in Topper, a risqué 1926 novel by Thorne Smith.  Roach immediately wanted Cary Grant to play George Kerby, but he had difficulty getting the actor to agree to play the part, since Grant was concerned that the supernatural aspects of the story would not work. Roach sold the film to Grant as a screwball comedy—with fee of $50,000.

For Grant's opposite number, Roach was interested in Jean Harlow, and as Topper W. C. Fields, but Harlow was on the brink of death, and Fields turned down the offer. When Roach reached out to Constance Bennett, she was impressed enough with the property that she agreed to be paid less than her usual $40,000 fee.

Topper was shot at Hal Roach Studios in Culver City, and location shooting took place at the entrance to the Bullock's department store on Wilshire Boulevard - as the entrance to the "Seabreeze Hotel" - and at a location on San Rafael Avenue in Pasadena, California.

The automobile used by George and Marion Kerby, before they become ghosts, and later by Cosmo Topper - whose own car is a 1936 Lincoln Model K - is a custom-made vehicle with a resemblance to Cord and Duesenberg automobiles of the 1930s. Production models of a Cord were too small to use, so  the custom body was built on the chassis of a 1936 Buick Roadmaster by Bohman & Schwartz and the external exhaust pipes characteristic of a supercharged Cord are non-functional; the Buick Roadmaster of the time used an eight-in-line ("straight eight") engine whereas the Cord used a V-8 engine - so external exhaust pipes on both sides of the hood (as per the Cord arrangement) would have meant that at least one side of the car (and probably both) used dummy external pipes. The Buick trunk had special compartments for camera equipment. Afterwards, the car was purchased by the Gilmore Oil Co., who used it for many years for promotional purposes. In 1954, the vehicle was updated utilizing a Chrysler Imperial chassis and drive train.

Reception
Topper was a box-office hit, and gave a boost to the careers of all the lead actors, in particular Cary Grant, who moved from this film into a sequence of classic screwball comedies such as The Awful Truth (1937), Bringing Up Baby (1938), and Holiday (1938). Constance Bennett, previously known as more of a "clothes-horse" than an actress, received very good notices, and Roach reunited her with director McLeod and screenwriters Jevne and Moran, as well as Billie Burke and Alan Mowbray, in Merrily We Live (1938).

Awards and honors
Topper was nominated for Academy Awards for Best Actor in a Supporting Role for Roland Young - his only nomination - and Best Sound, Recording for Elmer Raguse.

The film is recognized by American Film Institute in these lists:
 2000: AFI's 100 Years... 100 Laughs - #60
 2008: AFI's 10 Top 10:
 Nominated Fantasy Film

Sequels and adaptations
Topper was followed by the sequels Topper Takes a Trip (1938) and Topper Returns (1941).

A television series premiered in 1953 and ran for two seasons (78 episodes). It starred Leo G. Carroll as Topper and Robert Sterling and Anne Jeffreys as the ghosts, who died in an avalanche while skiing. They are accompanied by the ghost of Neil, a St. Bernard dog who died trying to rescue them.

A television pilot for a proposed new series, Topper Returns, was produced in 1973. It stars Roddy McDowall as the nephew of Cosmo Topper (now deceased) and Stefanie Powers and John Fink as the Kerbys, who have transferred their attention to a younger generation. A TV movie remake (and pilot for a new TV series), Topper (1979) was also produced starring Kate Jackson, Jack Warden and Andrew Stevens. According to the article on Nearly Departed, a short-lived American TV series of the 1980s starring Eric Idle of Monty Python fame, it was based on the same premise. In 1999, Hugh Wilson was in talks with producer John Davis to direct a remake of Topper but the film was never produced.

Colorization
Topper was the first black-and-white film to be digitally colorized, re-released in 1985 by Hal Roach Studios, with color by Colorization, Inc. The film was chosen because its original 1937 release represented Hal Roach's entry into major feature film production. According to the studio: "In light of this history, it seems fitting that Topper should again be on the cutting edge of change, this time heralding the age of colorization as the first completed color version of a classic black and white motion picture".

See also
 List of ghost films

References

External links

 
 
 Topper at Turner Classic Movies
 
 Topper review at TVGuide.com
 Topper historic reviews, photo gallery at CaryGrant.net
 Hemmings Daily blog: SIA Flashback – The Topper Buick's Many Metamorphoses

1937 films
1930s fantasy comedy films
1937 romantic comedy films
1930s screwball comedy films
1930s ghost films
American black-and-white films
American fantasy comedy films
American ghost films
American romantic comedy films
American romantic fantasy films
American screwball comedy films
Hal Roach Studios
Films adapted into television shows
Films directed by Norman Z. McLeod
Films based on fantasy novels
Films based on romance novels
Films set in New York City
Metro-Goldwyn-Mayer films
Films about the afterlife
Films based on American novels
1930s English-language films
1930s American films